Look and Laugh is an Australian television series which aired from 1958 to 1959 on ATN-7. The series was hosted by Ray McGeary, who had his start as a performer on radio program Australia's Amateur Hour.

The series was a variety series, with emphasis on comedy. The weekly series aired in a 60-minute time-slot (running time excluding commercials is unknown), in black-and-white.

See also
The Danny Dean Show
Shower of Stars
On Camera

References

External links

1958 Australian television series debuts
1959 Australian television series endings
Black-and-white Australian television shows
English-language television shows
Australian variety television shows
Australian comedy television series